Stenella iteae is a species of anamorphic fungi.

Description
Belonging to the Stenella genus, this species is a Cercospora-like fungus with a superficial secondary mycelium, solitary conidiophores, conidiogenous cells with thickened and darkened conidiogenous loci and catenate or single conidia with dark, slightly thickened hila. This species is characterised by the absence of stromata, its long conidiophores developing from the external mycelium and conidia mostly with 1 to 2 septa.

See also
Stenella africana
Stenella constricta
Stenella uniformis
Stenella vermiculata
Stenella capparidicola
Stenella gynoxidicola

References

Further reading

External links

iteae
Fungi described in 2004